The Bluescasters is an American, Michigan-based blues band formed in 2004 in Ann Arbor, Michigan, United States, who play in a style somewhat reminiscent of the Allman Brothers' Trouble No More. Current band members include Doug Wolgat (Bass/Vocals), Harry Rodman (Drums/Vocals), Phil Ryski (Guitar/Harmonica/Keyboards), and Kerry Adams (Guitar/Vocals).

History
The Bluescasters band was founded in 2004 as a blues band in Ann Arbor, Michigan. Founding members Doug Wolgat and Harry Rodman met while playing with The Witch Doctors. After playing in local clubs for a year, the Bluescasters released their debut album, Five Dimes, followed by Give Yourself the Blues in 2006. Their third album LIVE was released in 2010.
In 2009, they opened for Jim McCarty and Mystery Train, and in 2010 for Kim Wilson's Blues All Stars. They have performed at the Alpena Blues Festival, Plymouth's Music in the Air, Ypsilanti's Heritage Festival, Ann Arbor's Summer Festival, and at many Michigan clubs.

Discography
Five Dimes  (2005)
Give Yourself the Blues  (2006)
LIVE  (2010)
Something Going Down  (2014)
Bluescaster  (2016)

Awards

 2006 - Finalists in the Detroit Blues Society Blues Challenge
 2007 - Detroit Music Awards nomination: "Outstanding Blues Artist/Group"
 2007 - Detroit Music Awards nomination: "Outstanding Blues/R & B Recording" for Give Yourself the Blues
 2010 - Finalists in the Windsor Battle of the Blues (placed second)

References

External links
 The Bluescasters official site
 The Bluescasters myspace page

American blues musical groups
Musical groups established in 2004
2004 establishments in Michigan